DZRP - Radyo Pilipinas Worldwide (also known as Voice of the Philippines and RP3, then known as Radyo Pagasa) is a short-wave radio station broadcasting outside the Philippines. Owned by the Philippine Broadcasting Service under the Presidential Communications Group, the station is operated from Mondays to Sundays 1:30 AM to 11:30 AM PST (17:30-03:30 UTC) on various shortwave frequencies, with internet live streaming across all schedules. It broadcasts in Filipino and English languages. Radyo Pilipinas Worldwide uses the relay transmitter facilities of Voice of America in Tinang, Concepcion, Tarlac for its broadcast purposes.

As PBS made a rebranding of its flagship network Radyo ng Bayan and station DZSR into Radyo Pilipinas by 2017, the shortwave station remains unchanged but added "Worldwide" to its name to avert confusion.

History
During the Martial Law era, the National Media Production Center (NMPC) operated its own station Voice of the Philippines (VOP) on 2 frequencies: 920 kHz on AM, and 9.81 MHz on shortwave.

After EDSA Revolution in 1986, the NMPC and Bureau of Broadcasts (BB) were abolished, led to its stations (including VOP) were reassigned to the newly-reinstated PBS. VOP was later rebranded as Radyo Pagasa until in 1987 when the station became Radyo Pilipinas under its own callsign DZRP.

Programming

Available time and frequencies
As of January 2023, Radyo Pilipinas Worldwide is available on the following times (schedule and shortwave frequencies may changed without prior notice):

Radyo Pilipinas' programs can also be heard via live audio streaming in the internet from 11:30pm to 12:00 noon of the next day PST.

See also
Philippine Broadcasting Service
Radyo Pilipinas 1 738
Radyo Pilipinas Dos 918
87.5 FM1
104.3 FM2

External links
DZRP Radyo Pilipinas LIVE Audio

International broadcasters
Philippine radio networks
Radio stations in the Philippines
Philippine Broadcasting Service
People's Television Network
Filipino diaspora